Martadi is a town and seat of Bajura District Coordination Committee. It is also the headquarters of the Badi Malika Municipality.  At the time of the 1991 Nepal census it had a population of 4,618 and had 942 houses in the town but now it has increased by growth rate of 2.62 and reached 8807. 

The town and surrounding area is under the jurisdiction of the Martadi District Police.

Population
At the time of the 2011 Nepal census it had a population of 8,807(4,101 Female & 4,706 Male) people living in 1,290 individual Households.

Colleges and schools in Martadi 
 Bajura Multiple Campus 
It has been conditioning the bachelor level programs with affiliation to Tribhuwan University, Kirtipur, Kathmandu, Nepal.
 Badimalika English Boarding School
 Converse Academy
 Shree Malika Higher Secondary School

Gallery

References

Populated places in Bajura District